Yongala is a small town located in the state of South Australia, Australia. It has a population of approximately 240 people and is situated on the Clare-Peterborough Road (B79), 238 km (148 mi) from Adelaide, the state capital.

History
The Hundred of Yongala was proclaimed in the County of Dalhousie in 1871, one of the first of the twelve hundreds to be declared in that county, opening up the area for closer settlement and small-scale cultivation. The town was proclaimed on 23 May 1876. Within five years there was a population of 353 as developers anticipated the connection of a railway. Instead, the railway was built through the nearby town of Peterborough.

The SS Yongala launched in 1903 and owned by the Adelaide Steamship Company was named after the town. It sank in a storm in 1911 off the coast of Townsville, Queensland and its wreck site is protected by the Commonwealth Historic Shipwrecks Act 1976.

Geography and climate
Yongala has a warm semi-arid climate (Köppen BSk).

References

Towns in South Australia